The 1994 KAL Cup Korea Open was a tennis tournament played on outdoor hard courts that was part of the World Series of the 1994 ATP Tour. It was played at Seoul in South Korea from April 18 through April 25, 1994.

Finals

Singles

 Jeremy Bates defeated  Jörn Renzenbrink 6–4, 6–7(6–8), 6–3
 It was Bates' 2nd title of the year and the 4th of his career.

Doubles

 Stéphane Simian /  Kenny Thorne defeated  Kent Kinnear /  Sébastien Lareau 6–4, 3–6, 7–5
 It was Simian's 2nd title of the year and the 2nd of his career. It was Thorne's 1st title of the year and the 1st of his career.

References

External links
 ITF tournament edition details

 
KAL Cup Korea Open
Seoul Open